Pixie is a free (open source), photorealistic raytracing renderer for generating photorealistic images, developed by Okan Arikan in the Department of Computer Science at The University of Texas At Austin. It is RenderMan-compliant (meaning it reads conformant RIB, and supports full SL shading language shaders) and is based on the Reyes rendering architecture, but also support raytracing for hidden surface determination.

Like the proprietary BMRT, Pixie is popular with students learning the RenderMan Interface, and is a suitable replacement for it.
Contributions to Pixie are facilitated by SourceForge and the Internet where it can also be downloaded free of charge as source code or precompiled. It compiles for Windows (using Visual Studio 2005), Linux and on Mac OS X (using Xcode or Unix-style configure script).

Key features include:
 64-bit Capable
 Fast multi-threaded execution.
 Possibility to distribute the rendering process to several machines.
 Motion blur and depth of field.
 Programmable shading (using RenderMan Shading Language) including full displacement support.
 Scalable, multi-resolution raytracing using ray differentials.
 Global illumination.
 Support for conditional RIB.
 Point cloud baking and 3D textures.

Pixie is developed by Okan Arikan and George Harker.

External links
 Home page
 Pixie Wiki
 Blender - Open Source 3D Creator
 Rib Mosaic - Blender Rib Export

Free 3D graphics software
3D rendering software for Linux